John of Freiburg-Neuchâtel (died 1458) was a son of Conrad of Freiburg and his wife, Marie of Vergy.  He succeeded his father as Count of Neuchâtel in 1421.  He is, however, not in a hurry to pay homage to his father-in-law John III of Chalon-Arlay.  In 1444, he joined the alliance of the Dauphin Louis and a number of Swiss cantons against the Habsburgs.

In 1452, the childless John considered leaving his county after his death of his friend Rudolf IV of Baden-Sausenberg.  His liege lord Louis II of Chalon-Arlay reminded him that he still hadn't paid homage.  John reluctantly did this, and left his possessions to Rudolph IV in his will. John married Marie, the daughter of John III of Chalon-Arlay.  The marriage remained childless.

Counts of Neuchâtel
Year of birth uncertain
1457 deaths
15th-century German people
1396 births